The FC Basel 1915–16 season was their twenty-third season since the club's foundation on 15 November 1893. The club's chairman was Philipp Leichner at the beginning of the season and during the season Franz Rinderer took over as chairman. FC Basel played their home games in the Landhof in the district Wettstein in Kleinbasel. Retrospectively considered, the most important event in this FCB season, was the fact that the first youth department was founded.

Overview 
It had been in planning for a few years and to the beginning of this season FCB founded their youth department and employed some part-time youth trainers. Right from the very first day there were over 50 youngsters who joined the teams. Amongst these youngsters, for example, was Walter Dietrich, who was 13 years old as he joined. Other youngsters were Karl Bielser, Max Galler, Theodor Schär and Ernst Zorzotti who were all to advance to become important first team players.

Because the holidays for the members of the Swiss Army are now becoming more frequent, a football championship as played in the pre-war years, could again be carried out as of the 1915–16 season. Team captain was Ernst Kaltenbach and as captain he led the trainings and was responsible for the line-ups. Basel played a total of 28 matches in this season. 14 of these matches were in the domestic league and 14 were friendly matches. Of these friendlies, six were won, three were drawn and five ended in a defeat. There were six one home fixtures played in the Landhof and eight away games. Four of these games were played in the Basel championship against the two other local teams Old Boys and Nordstern Basel. FC Basel won the Basel championship collecting three victories and a draw. In all of these friendly games Basel scored 31 goals and conceded 30.

The Swiss Serie A 1915–16 was divided into three regional groups, east, central and west. There were seven teams in the east group, eight in the central group and six in the west group. FC Baden could not participate because their field was used for agricultural purposes due to the war. Basel and the two other local teams, Old Boys and Nordstern Basel, were allocated to the Central group. Further teams playing in the central group were two from the capital, Young Boys and FC Bern, two from La Chaux-de-Fonds, FC La Chaux-de-Fonds, Étoile-Sporting FC La Chaux-de-Fonds and finally Biel-Bienne.

Basel didn't start well into the championship, winning only one of the first eight games. They ended the season in second-last position with nine points. In their 14 games Basel scored 30 goals and conceded 39. Local rivals Nordstern Basel were bottom of the league with just four points and these points were won in the derbys against Basel. Because during the war years there was no promotion or relegation, Nordstern did not have to play a play-out. The other local rivals Old Boys won the group and continued to the finals. Here they played against Cantonal Neuchatel and Winterthur. Cantonal eventually won the championship in the Finals.

Players 
Squad members

Results 

Legend

Friendly matches

Pre-season

Winter break

Serie A

Central Group results

Central Group league table

See also
 History of FC Basel
 List of FC Basel players
 List of FC Basel seasons

References

Sources 
 Rotblau: Jahrbuch Saison 2014/2015. Publisher: FC Basel Marketing AG. 
 Die ersten 125 Jahre. Publisher: Josef Zindel im Friedrich Reinhardt Verlag, Basel. 
 FCB team 1915–16 at fcb-archiv.ch
 Switzerland 1915-16 at RSSSF

External links
 FC Basel official site

FC Basel seasons
Basel